David Zindell (born November 28, 1952) is an American writer known for science fiction and fantasy epics.

Writing career 
Zindell's first published story was "The Dreamer's Sleep" in Fantasy Book in 1984. His novelette Shanidar, which shared a background with his first novel Neverness, won the Writers of the Future contest in 1985. He followed Neverness with a sequel trilogy called A Requiem for Homo Sapiens.

Zindell's fantasy series The Ea Cycle has as a theme the evolution of consciousness, through the method of fantasy. The plot concerns a prince named Valashu Elahad searching for a relic called the Lightstone to stop the immortal Morjin, Lord of Lies, who seeks to create a world filled with madness.

In 2015 he published Splendor, a nonfiction book, and in 2017 he published The Idiot Gods, a novel told from the point of view of intelligent killer whales.

Style and Themes 
John Clute wrote that Zindell was a "romantic, ambitious, and skilled" writer. Zindell has described his style as an attempt to communicate the connectedness of things, the connection between mysticism and evolution, and the possibilities of life, and his fiction as an attempt to heal false dichotomies such as materialism and spirituality.

Personal life 
Zindell was born in Toledo, Ohio, and resides today in Boulder, Colorado, where he works as a test coach; he received a BA in mathematics and minored in anthropology at the University of Colorado at Boulder.

Publications

Neverness Universe
 "Shanidar", Writers of the Future (March 1985); online reprint at infinity plus
 Neverness (New York: D. I. Fine, 1988)
A Requiem for Homo Sapiens (trilogy):
 The Broken God (HarperCollins, 1992); US ed., Bantam, 1994
 The Wild (Harper Voyager, 1995); US ed., Bantam, 1996
 War in Heaven (Voyager, Bantam, 1998)
 The Remembrancer's Tale (Harper Voyager, 2023)

Ea Cycle
 The Lightstone (London: Harper Voyager, August 2001); also published as two volumes, The Ninth Kingdom and The Silver Sword (Voyager, 2002)
 The Lightstone, revised edition (Tor Books, June 2006) – first American ed. of volume one
 The Silver Sword (Tor, 2007) – American sequel
 The Lord of Lies (Voyager, 2003); US ed., Tor, 2008
 Black Jade (Voyager, 2005); not released in U.S.
 The Diamond Warriors (Voyager, 2007); not released in U.S.

Other novels
The Orca's Song (originally published as The Idiot Gods, Harper Voyager, July 2017)

Other short stories
 "The Dreamer's Sleep", Fantasy Book, December 1984
 "Caverns", Interzone (UK), Winter 1985/86
 "When the Rose Is Dead", Full Spectrum 3, June 1991

Essays
 Read This (1994)
 Splendor (Bhodi Books, 2015)

References

External links 

 
 David Zindell on Goodreads
 Storm of Numbers, Chalice of Light, an interview on Infinity Plus
 
 

American fantasy writers
American science fiction writers
1952 births
Living people
University of Colorado alumni
Writers from Boulder, Colorado
Writers from Toledo, Ohio
American male essayists
American male novelists
American male short story writers
20th-century American male writers
21st-century American male writers
20th-century American essayists
21st-century American essayists
20th-century American novelists
21st-century American novelists
20th-century American short story writers
21st-century American short story writers
Novelists from Ohio
Novelists from Colorado